Pohjanpalo is a Finnish surname. Notable people with the surname include:

Joel Pohjanpalo (born 1994), Finnish football striker
Tuomas Pohjanpalo (1861–1933), Finnish industrialist and politician

Finnish-language surnames